Tanomura Chikuden (July 14, 1777 - October 20, 1835) was a Japanese painter of the Edo period. He is known for his depictions of nature, often melancholic in style.

Biography
Tanomura Chikuden was born on July 14, 1777, in Bungo Province, Japan. In the beginning of his lifetime, he had been planning on being a scholar of Confucius. As a young man, he also was interested in painting. He was able to study under a local painter from his area. He then became more interested in painting and then became a student of the bunjin-ga painter Tani Bunchō. He dedicated a part of his life to seeking reform from the lords in which he lived under. There had been rebellions and uprisings in order to try to persuade the reforms. He eventually decided to retire and focus his attention to painting and was consequently able to truly develop his own personal style.

He died on October 20, 1835, in Ōsaka, Japan.

Career
Tanomura Chikuden developed his style in a way that emphasized his gentle strokes and melancholy tone. His artwork usually included the subject matter of flowers, birds, and landscapes. He also wrote works on the Nanga school, of which the Sanchūjin jōzetsu (The Recluse's Tattle) is the best known.

References

External links
Bridge of dreams: the Mary Griggs Burke collection of Japanese art, a catalog from The Metropolitan Museum of Art Libraries (fully available online as PDF), which contains material on Tanomura Chikuden (see index)

Japanese painters
1777 births
1835 deaths